Ponnekal is a village in Khammam district, Telangana, India.

References

Villages in Khammam district